Glycine microphylla, commonly known as the small-leaf glycine is a small scrambling plant in the bean family, found in south eastern Australia, also in the north east (tropical Queensland). Leaves are in threes, 1.5 to cm long, 1 to 6 mm wide. Flowers are variable in colour, often mauve. A widespread plant, often seen on soils derived from shale and metamorphic rocks. The specific epithet microphylla refers to the small leaves.

References 

microphylla
Flora of New South Wales
Flora of Queensland
Flora of Victoria (Australia)
Flora of Tasmania
Flora of South Australia
Taxa named by George Bentham